"Goodbye's (The Saddest Word)" is a song recorded by Canadian recording artist Celine Dion for her seventh English-language album A New Day Has Come (2002). The song was written and produced by Robert John "Mutt" Lange, while Lange and his then-wife, country singer Shania Twain did the backing vocals. Lyrically, the song speaks about motherly love and fear of losing one's mother. It was released as the album's third and last commercial single on 18 November 2002 by Columbia Records and Epic Records.

The song received favorable reviews from music critics, who called it a "heartfelt and emotional song", while praising Dion's performance. The "Goodbye's (The Saddest Word)" music video was directed by Chris Applebaum between 12–13 October 2002 in Paris, France, and premiered in November 2002. The song performed moderately on the charts, peaking inside the top fifty in the countries that it charted, but it did not match the success of previous singles.

Background and composition 
"Goodbye's (The Saddest Word)" was written and produced by Robert John "Mutt" Lange, who already worked with Dion in 1999 on "If Walls Could Talk." Lange and his then-wife, country singer Shania Twain did the backing vocals. The song runs to 5 minutes 19 seconds with a radio edit of 4 minutes 23 seconds. It was recorded at Studio Piccolo and released 18 November 2002.

Lyrically, the devastatingly emotional ballad speaks about the absolute love between a child and her mother. "There is no other love like a mother's love for her child," she sings. Céline first heard the Robert John "Mutt" Lange song three years ago [1999] and turn it down. "Now, being a mother, I found the strength to sing it, but it was hard," she said. Its lesson? "Never wait too long to tell someone how you feel," she answered.

In October 2008, "Goodbye's (The Saddest Word)" was included on the European version of My Love: Ultimate Essential Collection greatest hits.

Critical reception 
Barnes & Noble's editorial review called it "a heartfelt, country-tinged song." Chuck Taylor from Billboard criticized the choice of the third single, "Goodbye's (The Saddest Word)," a ballad relegated solely to adult contemporary radio stations. He noticed that the song is "devastatingly beautiful," offering a loving tribute to one's mother at death's door and that Dion "delivers it with a heaving helping of passion, emotionally drawing one's attention to the devotional message." Although he felt that many will connect to the loss of a parent, on a commercial level, this was a disappointing decision. Mike Ross of Jam! Canoe wrote, "Celine is at her lovey-doveyest in Mutt Lange's Goodbye's (The Saddest Word), helped by not one, but two soaring key changes in the same song, which is then launched into a high Earth orbit of melodrama by an orchestra that would make John Williams blush with envy." Commenting for Rolling Stone in May 2002, Rob Sheffield said of the Mutt Lange composition it is "sure to inspire many hours of dull debate with Bernie Taupin." The reviewer also alluded to Dion's voice as "just furniture polish". Sal Cinquemani of Slant Magazine commented, "It is the kind of sappy mama-lovin' tune that will leave you nauseous or in tears." Christopher Smith from TalkAboutPopMusic described the song as a "beautiful Country-style pop ballad."

Commercial performance 
The song performed moderately on the charts, peaking inside the top-forty in some countries. On the Belgian Flanders Singles Chart, the song debuted at number 47, on 14 December 2002. The following week, the song fell to number 49, but on 28 December 2002, the song climbed to number 46. In its fourth week, the song peaked at number 39. On the Belgian Wallonia Singles Chart, the song debuted and peaked at number 36, leaving the charts the following week. In [the Netherlands, the song debuted at number 67 on the Dutch Top 40, on 30 November 2002. The following week, the song jumped to number 51. The song  kept fluctuating on the chart for the next two weeks, until it climbed from number 67 to number 42. On 18 January 2003, the song peaked at number 38, spending 11 consecutive weeks on the chart.

In Austria, the song debuted at number 50 on the Ö3 Austria Top 40. The following week, the song climbed to number 49 and later, it moved to number 45, until it peaked at number 41. The song spent 10 weeks on the chart. In the UK, the song debuted at number 38 on the UK Singles Chart, on 7 December 2002. The following week, the song dropped to number 60, spending only 2 weeks on the UK charts. In Ireland, the song debuted at number 42 on the Irish Singles Chart, on 28 November 2002. The following week, the song remained at the same position and it dropped at number 49, spending 3 weeks on the chart.

Music video 
The "Goodbye's (The Saddest Word)" music video was directed by Chris Applebaum between 12–13 October 2002 in Paris, France, and premiered in November 2002. In 2006, a second version of the video leaked to the internet, including never before seen footage. This unreleased version was also directed by Chris Applebaum in October 2002 but shows more Dion sexier scenes. Some lyrics near the end of the song were omitted and/or altered.

Live performances 
Dion performed the song for the first time at the A New Day Has Come CBS Special in March 2002. She also performed the song on Star Academy, in 2002. She also performed it on "World Children's Day 2002". Dion also performed it on the Top of the Pops in 2002.

Formats and track listings
The European version of the single included "All Because of You," which could be found on the single and on the special limited edition of A New Day Has Come from November 2002. The single featured also a duet with Anastacia on "You Shook Me All Night Long," taken from the VH1 Divas Las Vegas CD/DVD released in October 2002.

European CD single
"Goodbye's (The Saddest Word)" (Radio Edit) – 4:23
"All Because of You" – 3:30

European CD maxi-single 
"Goodbye's (The Saddest Word)" (Radio Edit) – 4:23
"All Because of You" – 3:30
"You Shook Me All Night Long" (with Anastacia - Live from VH1 Divas) – 3:51
"Blue Christmas" – 3:50
"Goodbye's (The Saddest Word)" (Video - Live from TV Special) – 4:43

UK cassette single
"Goodbye's (The Saddest Word)" (Radio Edit) – 4:23
"Blue Christmas" – 3:50
"All the Way" (with Frank Sinatra) – 3:53

UK CD single
"Goodbye's (The Saddest Word)" (Radio Edit) – 4:23
"Blue Christmas" – 3:50
"Goodbye's (The Saddest Word)" (Video - Live from TV Special) – 4:43

UK CD single #2
"Goodbye's (The Saddest Word)" – 5:19
"All the Way" (with Frank Sinatra) – 3:53
"You Shook Me All Night Long" (with Anastacia - Live from VH1 Divas) – 3:51

Charts

Credits and personnel
Recording locations
Recording -  Piccolo Studio (Montreal, Quebec)

Personnel
Songwriting –   Robert John "Mutt" Lange
Production –  Robert John "Mutt" Lange
Backing Vocals - Mutt Lange, Shania Twain
Guitars - Mutt Lange
Mixing - Humberto Gatica
Strings - Gavin Greenaway

Credits adapted from the liner notes of A New Day Has Come, Epic Records.

Release history

References

External links

Celine Dion songs
2002 singles
Songs written by Robert John "Mutt" Lange
Song recordings produced by Robert John "Mutt" Lange
2002 songs
Music videos directed by Chris Applebaum
Pop ballads
2000s ballads
Columbia Records singles
Epic Records singles